Sarah Mack  (born circa 1973) is a Scottish television presenter and journalist.

Mack started her career at the now-defunct Edinburgh Live cable TV station as a runner and production journalist. Within two months of working for the station, she made her first on-screen appearance as a weather presenter.

She joined Grampian Television (now STV North) in August 1998 as a reporter and presenter for North Tonight. Whilst at Grampian, Mack also presented the social affairs series Grampian Midweek, magazine show Grampian Weekend (alongside Michael Crow), outdoor pursuits' programme The Great Outdoors and for Scottish Television, travel show Scottish Passport (alongside Bryan Burnett).

Mack left Grampian Television in 2003 to become a full-time mother but has now returned to television as a reporter and presenter for BBC Scotland's in 2007, rural affairs programme, Landward but is due to leave, after discovering she was paid less than her male colleagues.

Sarah began presenting items for The One Show in 2012.

Sarah the presenter and journalist, who lives with her husband, farmer David Stephen and their four sons in 16th Century Barra in Aberdeenshire.

References

Living people
Scottish television presenters
Scottish women television presenters
Scottish women journalists
STV News newsreaders and journalists
Year of birth uncertain
Year of birth missing (living people)